Macropanax is a genus of flowering plants of the family Araliaceae, comprising 20 species. They are distributed from Central China to Sikkim, Nepal and Bhutan and to western Malaysia.

Species include:
Macropanax baviensis
Macropanax chienii
Macropanax concinnus
Macropanax decandrus
Macropanax dispermus
Macropanax grushvitzkii
Macropanax maingayi
Macropanax meghalayensis
Macropanax membranifolius
Macropanax paucinervis
Macropanax rosthornii
Macropanax schmidii
Macropanax sessilis
Macropanax simplicifolius
Macropanax skvortsovii
Macropanax undulatus
Macropanax vidalii

References

 
Apiales genera